Hot Pursuit is a 2015 American action comedy film directed by Anne Fletcher and distributed by Warner Bros. Pictures. It was written by David Feeney and John Quaintance. Its story follows a police officer assigned to protect the widow of a drug boss from corrupt cops and criminals who want her dead as they race through Texas to avoid detection. It stars Reese Witherspoon and Sofía Vergara.

The film was produced by New Line Cinema, Metro-Goldwyn-Mayer, and Pacific Standard and was released on May 8, 2015. It grossed $13.9 million during its opening weekend and $51.4 million worldwide, against a budget of $35 million. It received negative reviews from critics, and has a 8% approval rating based on 179 reviews on Rotten Tomatoes.

Plot
Rose Cooper is a San Antonio Police Department officer whose work ethic is too intense. Following an incident in which the mayor's son yells "Shotgun!", setting him on fire by tasing him while he carried an alcoholic drink, Cooper's ineptness in the field has her assigned to the evidence locker.

Cooper's commanding officer, Captain Emmett, gives her a secret assignment to join Deputy US Marshal Jackson, protecting Felipe Riva and his wife Daniella. Riva must testify against cartel leader Vicente Cortez. At the Riva home, a pair of masked assassins and a different pair of assassins kill Jackson and Felipe while Cooper and Daniella are upstairs. Daniella grabs one suitcase, containing many pairs of shoes, and the women flee in Riva's car. When Daniella later tries to run off, Cooper handcuffs herself to her.

They are found by Cooper's fellow officers Dixon and Hauser. Cooper realizes the officers are one of the assassin teams when she sees the longhorn tattoo, so they escape and head for Dallas, where Daniella can testify against Cortez.

The women learn Cooper is now labelled a fugitive fleeing with Daniella. A tractor trailer plows into the car, spraying hidden cocaine everywhere. Cooper gets the truck driver to drop them at a store, where Daniella and the very high Cooper change their clothes. When the assassins show up, they stow away in a horse trailer hooked to a pickup truck. When the truck stops Cooper tries to steal it, but the owner, Red, reappears with a gun. She and Daniella flee, find another pickup, and drive away.

The ladies continue bonding, with Cooper admitting her rigid, by-the-books nature has made it difficult to meet a man. They are surprised to find a man named Randy sleeping in the back of the pickup. He is a felon with an ankle bracelet for viciously assaulting his sisters' abusive boyfriends. Cooper agrees to take off the bracelet in exchange for Randy's help. Daniella is pleased to see Randy flirting with Cooper.

Daniella explains her bag of shoes are covered with $4 million in real diamonds, revealing Cortez's money laundering method. When Dixon and Hauser appear and shoot at them, Randy attacks Hauser, allowing the women to run.

The women hitch a ride on a tour bus, until Dixon and Hauser catch up to them on the road. Taking the wheel, they shoot back at the crooked cops, and end up running the men off the road. After they succeed, Daniella knocks out Cooper in a single punch.

Cooper wakes up and sees Daniela talking to the assassins who were also chasing them. We discover she is working with the assassins to murder Cortez as revenge for killing her brother. Additionally, she was not going to testify in Dallas, but instead hired the men to 'kidnap' her before she was escorted out of her house. She leaves Cooper, going with the men to take down Vincente Cortez.

Soon after, Cooper is cleared of any wrongdoing after explaining what happened. Captain Emmett advises her to let the FBI take care of Cortez, but she ignores him.

Sneaking into Cortez's daughter's Quinceañera as a man to get close to Daniella, she tries to get her to wear a wire to get Cortez' confession to her brother's murder. A woman walking into the bathroom mistakes Cooper for a pervert and throws her out. Getting back into the party, running into Emmett, she learns he is working for Cortez. He pulls a gun on her, but Cooper pours alcohol on him and tases him so he catches fire.

Daniella corners Cortez and reveals her intentions to kill him. Cooper arrives and stops her, but when he draws a gun Cooper shoots him dead.

Three months later, Daniella is released from prison, and Cooper picks her up and transports her out.  She surprises Daniella with her old pairs of very valuable shoes.  She also reveals that Randy is in the car with her, and Daniella likes Cooper's new "wild side", as they drive off together.

Cast
 Reese Witherspoon as Officer Rose Cooper
 Sofía Vergara as Daniella Riva
 Robert Kazinsky as Randy
 Matthew Del Negro as Detective Hauser
 Michael Mosley as Detective Dixon
 Richard T. Jones as U.S. Marshall Jackson
 Benny Nieves as Jesus
 Michael Ray Escamilla as Angel
 Joaquín Cosío as Vicente Cortez
 John Carroll Lynch as Captain Emmett
 Jim Gaffigan as Red
 Mike Birbiglia as Steve
 Vincent Laresca as Felipe Riva
 David Jensen as Wayne
 Evaluna Montaner as Teresa Cortez
 Bryce Romero as Cooper's prom date

Production
The film was originally titled Don't Mess with Texas. Principal photography began on May 12, 2014 in New Orleans, Louisiana, and was set to last for two months.

Marketing
The film's first trailer was released on February 12, 2015.

Release
Hot Pursuit released in theaters on May 8, 2015. It was then released on Digital Download on July 28, 2015, and the DVD and Blu-ray were released on August 11, 2015.

Reception

Box office
Hot Pursuit grossed $34.6 million in the US and Canada, and $16.9 million in other territories, for a worldwide total of $51.5 million.

In its opening weekend, the film grossed $13.9 million, finishing second at the box office behind Avengers: Age of Ultron, which was in its second week ($77.7 million).

Critical response
On Rotten Tomatoes, Hot Pursuit has an approval rating of 8% based on 179 reviews, with an average rating of 3.17/10. The website's critical consensus reads, "Shrill and unfunny, Hot Pursuit bungles what should have been an easy opportunity to showcase Reese Witherspoon and Sofia Vergara's likable odd-couple chemistry." On Metacritic, the film has a score of 31 out of 100 based on 36 critics, indicating "generally unfavorable reviews". Audiences polled by CinemaScore gave the film a grade of "C+" on an A+ to F scale.

Peter Travers of Rolling Stone gave it 1 out of 4 stars and wrote: "It's all stupefyingly unfunny. Hot Pursuit is one hot mess."
Richard Roeper of the Chicago Sun-Times called it "proof two females can make a bickering-opposites-action-comedy that’s just as lousy and sour as any clunker starring two guys."

Stephanie Zacharek of The Village Voice gave the film a positive review, with particular praise for the editing: "Hot Pursuit is a quiet triumph of tone and timing. Nearly every scene is cut at just the right point, often topped off with a fantastic kicker of dialogue."

Accolades
Actresses received four nominations at the Teen Choice Awards for performances in this film.
Reese Witherspoon received two nominations, Choice Movie Actress: Comedy and Choice Movie: Hissy Fit.
Reese Witherspoon and Sofía Vergara also received two nominations as a pair, for Choice Movie: Chemistry and Choice Movie: Liplock.

References

External links
 
 
 
 

2010s female buddy films
2010s chase films
2010s crime comedy films
2015 films
2015 action comedy films
American action comedy films
American buddy comedy films
American buddy cop films
2010s police comedy films
American chase films
American crime comedy films
American female buddy films
2010s English-language films
Girls with guns films
Films about Mexican drug cartels
Films directed by Anne Fletcher
Films produced by Reese Witherspoon
Films scored by Christophe Beck
Films set in Texas
Films shot in Los Angeles
Films shot in New Orleans
Metro-Goldwyn-Mayer films
New Line Cinema films
Warner Bros. films
2010s buddy cop films
2015 comedy films
Films about witness protection
2010s American films
2010s Mexican films